Self Explanatory may refer to:

 Self Explanatory (I-20 album), 2004
 Self Explanatory (Classified album), 2009